Michael J. Puskaric (born May 8, 1989) is an American politician who represented the 39th District in the Pennsylvania House of Representatives from 2019 to 2022.

Early life
Puskaric was born on May 8, 1989, in Allegheny County, Pennsylvania. He was a 2007 graduate of Serra Catholic High School in McKeesport, Pennsylvania, where he was also a football fullback and linesman. He graduated from Seton Hill University in Greensburg, Pennsylvania, Pennsylvania in 2012, where he obtained a Bachelor of Arts degree in Communications.

Political career
In 2018, Puskaric ran for election to represent District 39 in the Pennsylvania House of Representatives. He defeated Robert Rhoderick Jr. in the general election for Pennsylvania House of Representatives District 39 on November 6, 2018, with 55.8% of the vote. He sought re-election in 2020, defeating Sara-Summer Oliphant on November 3, 2020, with 62.8% of the vote. In the 2022 Republican primary election, Puskaric lost re-nomination to Andrew Kuzma.

In 2020, Puskaric was among 26 Pennsylvania House Republicans who called for the reversal of Joe Biden's certification as the winner of Pennsylvania's electoral votes in the 2020 United States presidential election, citing false claims of election irregularities.

Personal
Puskaric was employed by Matrix Property Settlements in White Oak, Pennsylvania as a director of settlement operations.

References

External links
Michael J. Puskaric official PA House website

Republican Party members of the Pennsylvania House of Representatives
Living people
1989 births